NOAAS Thomas Jefferson (S 222) is a National Oceanic and Atmospheric Administration (NOAA) hydrographic survey vessel in service since 2003. The ship was built for the United States Navy as USNS Littlehales (T-AGS-52) serving as one of two new coastal hydrographic survey vessels from 1992 until transfer to NOAA in 2003 when it was named after Founding Father and third U.S. president, Thomas Jefferson.

USNS Littlehales 
The third hydrographic survey vessel to be named for mathematician, oceanographer, and civil engineer George Washington Littlehales, was laid down as the United States Navy USNS Littlehales (T-AGS-52) on October 25, 1989, by Halter Marine, Inc., at Moss Point, Mississippi. Launched on February 14, 1991, she was delivered to the Navy on January 10, 1992. The ship was operated by the Military Sealift Command with a contract crew for the Naval Oceanographic Office which assigned a military and civilian hydrographic detachment to conduct coastal surveys. The ship was the second hydrographic survey ship of the type, the first being .

The new vessels were about half the length of those large survey ships with two rather than four survey launches. Contract crew size was 24 instead of 70 for the larger ships and the military and Naval Oceanographic Office civilian hydrographic detachment could be decreased from 80 to 10.

Operations 
Littlehales conducted hydrographic surveys in domestic waters in support of Navy missions and in international and foreign waters in support of the Mapping, Charting, and Geodesy (MC&G) requirements of the National Geospatial-Intelligence Agency and its predecessor organization the Defense Mapping Agency. Those MC&G requirements support all military operations and also civilian mariners with products outside the U.S. territorial waters that are the charting responsibility of NOAA.

Examples of such hydrographic surveys that involve collection of tide and current information as well as depths include completion in 1994 of surveys of the coast of Albania that proved valuable for naval operations during the wars following the breakup of Yugoslavia. In 1999 the ship surveyed the Jordanian coastline including detailed surveys of the Port of Aqaba. During 2001 Littlehales surveyed the harbor  and approaches Dakar, Senegal and experienced petty piracy early in the morning of 14 May when the watch noticed a small boat with eight persons which sped off with subsequent discovery that six mooring lines were missing.

Examples of operations in domestic waters include surveys from 29 October 2001 to 28 January 2002 of the area of King's Bay, Georgia and St. Marys River approaches. Unclassified extracts of the classified surveys done for the Naval Submarine Base Kings Bay were provided to NOAA which surveyed to fill gaps. The ship was also involved in test and evaluation of new systems. An example is work involving the Deep Ocean Logging Platform with Hydrographic Instrumentation and Navigation (DOLPHIN), a diesel powered semi-submersible for surveying. The Naval Research Laboratory (NRL) was tasked to evaluate the vehicle in conjunction with the National Oceanic and Atmospheric Administration, the Naval Oceanographic Office and the Canadian Hydrographic Service.

Transfer to NOAA 
The ship was stricken from the Naval Vessel Register on February 27, 2003, and transferred to NOAA on March 3, 2003.

NOAAS Thomas Jefferson 
The ship was commissioned into the NOAA Atlantic Fleet as NOAAS Thomas Jefferson (S 222) on July 8, 2003, at Norfolk, Virginia, as a replacement for the NOAA survey ship NOAAS Whiting (S 329). Thomas Jeffersons home port is Norfolk.

Thomas Jefferson, "The Most Productive Survey Vessel In The World", is designed to collect hydrographic data from depths of between 10 meters (33 feet) and 4,000 meters (13,123 feet). She carries Global Positioning System and Loran-C receivers and a computerized data-collection system. She has a roll stabilization tank and a collision avoidance system.

Thomas Jefferson has  of deck working space. Her deck equipment features two winches; two fixed, telescopic, 7-ton-capacity cranes; and a C-frame.

Thomas Jefferson is equipped with an intermediate depth multibeam swath survey system. The vessel carries two aluminum survey launches equipped with multibeam swath and single-beam echo sounders and a hydrographic data acquisition system. There is an additional rigid-hulled inflatable boat which serves as a fast rescue boat.

Among the scientific equipment are conductivity, temperature, and depth (CTD) sensors, three side-scan sonar units, and sediment sampling equipment.

Thomas Jefferson utilizes Kongsberg EM2040, EM710, and Klien 5000 Side Scan Sonar

The ship has a total of 36 bunk spaces. Capacity for 22 people to eat at time can be found in the mess rooms.

Operational history 

In April 2003, after her transfer from the Navy to NOAA but before being commissioned into the NOAA fleet, the ship conducted surveys of the approaches to the Chesapeake Bay.

In 2004, Thomas Jefferson deployed her survey launches to participate in a United States Geological Survey of the sedimentary characteristics of Great Round Shoal at the far eastern edge of Nantucket Sound.

Thomas Jefferson got underway from Norfolk in 2005 for the United States Gulf Coast, where she played an active role in the response to Hurricane Katrina and Hurricane Rita by surveying port areas for obstructions. She surveyed the approaches to the Pascagoula and Gulfport, Mississippi, ship channels, and repaired the tide gauge at Pascagoula. She then conducted post-Rita surveys of the approaches to Galveston, Houston, and Port Arthur, Texas.

In 2006, Thomas Jefferson, in collaboration with the University of Rhode Island and the Institute for International Maritime Research, conducted a ten-day marine archaeological survey in a 74-square nautical mile (254-square kilometer) area off the coast of the Virginia-North Carolina border, employing side-scan sonar, a multibeam echosounder and a magnetometer in the hope of discovering the wreck of a ship that sank in the area in the early 17th century, the existence of which had been suggested in 1983 when fishermen hauled up a 400-year-old cannon in the area. The team identified approximately 200 targets in all, with 20 to 50 having the most promise of being the remains of a wooden ship from that period. It also documented numerous previously unknown dangers to navigation, including three unidentified shipwrecks.

In the autumn of 2006, Thomas Jefferson conducted hydrographic survey operations in New York Harbor, deploying her two survey launches to update the nautical charts for the area. Most of the project area was previously surveyed prior to 1982 and parts had not been surveyed since 1927. The work was challenging for the launches because of the busy shipping traffic in the harbor and currents from the Hudson River, East River, and Atlantic Ocean. Thomas Jeffersons survey resulted in the discovery of many unknown and forgotten small wrecks in Rockaway Inlet.

On 6 April 2010, Thomas Jefferson departed Norfolk bound for the Gulf of Mexico to conduct a five-month-long effort to map the seafloor, searching for hazards to navigation. On 26 May 2010, Thomas Jefferson was underway on a mission to deploy United States Navy ocean monitoring instruments near the BP Deepwater Horizon oil spill.

On 21 June 2013, Thomas Jefferson held a wreath-tossing ceremony on the 153rd anniversary of the sinking of the United States Coast Survey steamer USCS Robert J. Walker, which had sunk after a collision on 21 June 1860 in the Atlantic Ocean off New Jersey. It was the first commemoration ever held for the 20 men lost in the sinking, the largest loss of life in a single incident in the history of NOAA and its ancestor agencies. Lacking exact locating data for the wreck, Thomas Jefferson held the ceremony in the general area where Robert J. Walker had sunk. Later in the day, Thomas Jefferson used multibeam sonar and sidescan sonar to identify with 80 percent certainty the exact location and identity of Robert J. Walkers wreck for the first time. NOAA divers confirmed the wrecks identity on 23 June 2013.

On September 20, 2017 Hurricane Maria made landfall in Puerto Rico as a Category 4 storm after ravaging the U.S. Virgin Islands. As the storm passed to the north, Thomas Jefferson transited from Port Everglades, Florida, to these islands. There the ship’s 38 officers and crew conducted multibeam echo sounder (MBES) and side scan sonar (SSS) hydrographic surveys in the island ports and bays. Survey data helped inform U.S. Coast Guard and other national/regional authorities on decisions to allow and/or restrict commerce. Over three weeks the crew surveyed 13 areas and no fewer than 18 individual port facilities, as well as conducted emergency repairs to three tide and weather stations. NOAA Ship Thomas Jefferson returned to Puerto Rico in August 2018 to conduct seafloor surveys and observe and possible shoreline changes. The ship also hosted 80 local high school students and gave them an in-depth look at the technology and capabilities of the ship.

Due to her unique build the ship is condered the greatest asset to the nation in regards to her service to the great lakes.

Footnotes

Notes

References 
NOAA Marine Operations, "NOAA Ship Thomas Jefferson" http://www.moc.noaa.gov/tj/index.html.
NOAA Marine Operations, "NOAA Ship Thomas Jefferson: All Ship Specifications" http://www.moc.noaa.gov/tj/apr_2004_tj_specs.pdf.
NavSource Online: Service Ship Photo Archive T-AGS-52 Littlehales
United States Navy, "Littlehales (AGS 52)," Naval Vessel Register, .
Wertheim, Eric. The Naval Institute Guide to Combat Fleets of the World, 15th Edition: Their Ships, Aircraft, and Systems. Annapolis, Maryland: Naval Institute Press, 2007. . ISSN 1057-4581.

External links 
 USNS Littlehales (T-AGS-52) at NavSource Online: Service Ship Photo Archive

1991 ships
Ships built in Moss Point, Mississippi
Ships of the National Oceanic and Atmospheric Administration
Ships transferred from the United States Navy to the National Oceanic and Atmospheric Administration
Survey ships of the United States
Virginia-related ships
Ships named for Founding Fathers of the United States